Wainwright (Ulġuniq in Iñupiaq), also known as Ulguniq or Kuuk, is a city in North Slope Borough, Alaska, United States. At the 2010 census the population was 556, making it the third largest city in the North Slope Borough, up from 546 in 2000. The community was named after Wainwright Lagoon, which in turn was named after Lt. John Wainwright, an officer under Capt. F.W. Beechey, who were the first non-native people to travel to the lagoon in 1826. An unincorporated area known as Wainwright Inlet by 1890, Wainwright was founded as an incorporated municipality in 1904.

Geography and climate

There is little precipitation, mostly snow; however, the dry winters make the annual snowfall totals more modest than they would otherwise be. The Chukchi Sea is unfrozen from early July to late September.

Demographics

Wainwright first appeared on the 1890 U.S. Census as the unincorporated area of "Wainwright Inlet." This included the native settlement Kugmiut, camps on Kug River, Setorokamiut, Nuklwok, Nutnago and Shinnowok. All 72 residents were native. It did not appear again on the census until 1920, this time as Wainwright. It was formally incorporated in 1962.

As of the 2010 United States Census, there were 556 people living in the city. The racial makeup of the city was 90.1% Native American, 7.9% White and 1.6% from two or more races. 0.4% were Hispanic or Latino of any race.

At the 2000 census, there were 546 people, 148 households and 117 families living in the city. There were 179 housing units at an average density of 10.2 per square mile (3.9/km2). The racial makeup of the city was 6.78% White, 0.18% Black or African American, 90.29% Native American, and 2.75% from two or more races.

There were 148 households, of which 50.0% had children under the age of 18 living with them, 50.7% were married couples living together, 16.2% had a female householder with no husband present, and 20.3% were non-families. 18.2% of all households were made up of individuals, and 3.4% had someone living alone who was 65 years of age or older. The average household size was 3.69 and the average family size was 4.17.

37.7% of the population were under the age of 18, 13.4% from 18 to 24, 27.8% from 25 to 44, 14.3% from 45 to 64, and 6.8% who were 65 years of age or older. The median age was 24 years. For every 100 females, there were 114.1 males. For every 100 females age 18 and over, there were 117.9 males.

The median household income was $54,722 and the median family income was $58,125. Males had a median income of $36,667 versus $40,313 for females. The per capita income for the city was $16,709. About 8.5% of families and 12.5% of the population were below the poverty line, including 18.4% of those under age 18 and 5.3% of those age 65 or over.

Education
There is one school in Wainwright, the Alak School of the North Slope Borough School District, which serves students pre-kindergarten through grade 12.

See also
 The blob (Chukchi Sea algae)
 Wainwright Airport

References

External links
 Wainwright information

Chukchi Sea
Cities in Alaska
Cities in North Slope Borough, Alaska
Populated coastal places in Alaska on the Arctic Ocean
Populated places of the Arctic United States